The FIS Nordic World Ski Championships 1987 took place 11–21 February 1987 in Oberstdorf, West Germany. Following the domination of the skating technique at the previous championships, the International Ski Federation (FIS) introduced separate cross-country skiing races in the classical technique and the freestyle technique at these championships. For the only time (besides the 1988 Winter Olympics), the relays consisted of four freestyle legs.

Men's cross-country

15 km classical 
15 February 1987

30 km classical 
12 February 1987

50 km freestyle 
21 February 1987

4 × 10 km relay
17 February 1987

Women's cross-country

5 km classical 
16 February 1987

10 km classical 
13 February 1987

20 km freestyle 
20 February 1987

4 × 5 km relay
17 February 1987

Men's Nordic combined

15 km individual Gundersen 
13 February 1987

Kerry Lynch of the United States finished second in this event, but was later disqualified for doping. Bredesen would be awarded a silver medal and Weinbuch a bronze as a result.

3 × 10 km team
19 February 1987

Men's ski jumping

Individual normal hill 
20 February 1987

Individual large hill 
15 February 1987

Team large hill
17 February 1987

Medal table
Medal winners by nation.

Opening Event
The opening event was created and organised by Traumfabrik

References
FIS 1987 cross-country results
FIS 1987 Nordic combined results
FIS 1987 ski jumping results
Traumfabrik.de

FIS Nordic World Ski Championships
1987 in Nordic combined
1987 in West German sport
February 1987 sports events in Europe
1987 in Bavaria
Nordic skiing competitions in West Germany
Sports competitions in Oberstdorf